The Beaumont Civic Center, in downtown Beaumont, Texas, is a 6,500-seat arena where concerts, conventions, trade shows and exhibitions are held. Banquet maximum capacity is 2,000. The building includes four dressing rooms with showers.  850 parking spots are onsite. The venue is part of the Beaumont Civic Center Complex. This complex includes the Civic Center, Julie Rogers Theater and the Jefferson Theatre.

The Civic Center is the temporary home of the Beaumont Children's Museum.

Previous History

Home Court for Lamar Cardinals Basketball Team - 1980-1984

The Beaumont Civic Center was the home court for the Lamar Cardinals basketball men's team for four seasons from 1980-1984.  The Cardinals record at the Civic Center was 40-2.

Southland Conference Men's Basketball Tournament - 1981, 1983, 1984

The Southland Conference men's basketball tournament was held at the Beaumont Civic Center in 1981, 1983, and 1984.

The Streak - End of the 80 Game Home Court Winning Streak

The Lamar Cardinals men's basketball team's eighty (80) game home court winning streak started at McDonald Gym on February 18, 1978.  Before the Cardinals moved to their new home at the Beaumont Civic Center, McDonald Gym saw the first thirty-seven (37) straight home wins of the streak.  The remaining forty-three (43) straight home court wins of the streak were at the Beaumont Civic Center.  When the streak ended on March 10, 1984, the Cardinals were owners of seventh (7th) longest home court winning streak in NCAA history.

See also
 Fair Park Coliseum
 Ford Park
 Ford Arena
 Montagne Center

References

External links
 Official Site

Convention centers in Texas
Indoor arenas in Texas
Tourist attractions in Beaumont, Texas
Lamar Cardinals and Lady Cardinals basketball
Lamar Cardinals and Lady Cardinals basketball venues
Sports venues in Beaumont, Texas
Music venues in Beaumont, Texas